Delta Kappa Alpha is a national, gender-inclusive, cinematic professional fraternity founded in 1936 at the School of Cinematic Arts at the University of Southern California in Los Angeles, California, United States. The vision of Delta Kappa Alpha is to be recognized as the premier institute of upstanding entertainment industry leaders.

According to USC's cinema website, "Recognized by the School of Cinematic Arts as the official professional cinema fraternity at the University of Southern California, DKA engages the community through philanthropic, social, and professional events. The goal of this gender-inclusive fraternity is to establish meaningful relationships and camaraderie between students highly committed and interested in the film industry and in the cinematic arts."

History

Delta Kappa Alpha was founded on March 13, 1936, at the University of Southern California in Los Angeles, California, originally as a group for cinematographers. Soon the Alpha chapter encompassed all undergraduate divisions at the School of Cinematic Arts, including Film & TV Production, Critical Studies, Writing for Screen & Television, Animation & Digital Arts, and most recently Interactive Entertainment.

Ten men are honored as Delta Kappa Alpha's founding members:
 Allen K. Dallas
 William A. Halpern
 John W. Findlater
 Donald Fischer
 Jack H. McClelland
 Terry Bissinger
 Robert V. Rogers
 Louis Tarleton
 Robert Turner
 Peter Kinnel

Allen K. Dallas served as the first President of Delta Kappa Alpha.

The Alpha chapter had considerable influence in its first incarnation from 1936 until the mid-1980s. The fraternity had its own office within the School of Cinematic Arts building, equivalent to the current Student Production Office in today's SCA complex.

The fraternity also held annual banquets to honor notable contributors to the cinematic arts. Film legends such as Alfred Hitchcock and Fred Astaire were inducted into the fraternity as honorary members. Hollywood heavyweights such as Sophia Loren, George Cukor, and Judy Garland were known to attend these events.

The fraternity was in its heyday in the 1960s and 1970s, when Dirty Dozen members George Lucas and Howard Kazanjian were among its members. There were five national chapters with a membership of 1500 in 1965. However, by the mid-1980s the Alpha chapter as well as other chapters in the United States and South America had disbanded. Despite no longer being on campus, USC still held a "DKA film series" of screenings from 1982 until the late 2000s at the Norris Cinema Theater on campus, drawing hour-long lines every Friday.

All of the chapters deactivated because the national fraternity lacked an executive office, keeping it from surviving the anti-establishment period that shut down chapters and Greek organizations across the country.  Former National President and National Secretary Herbert E. Farmer protected the fraternity’s history through his well-preserved archive. This made it possible for the fraternity to be resurrected at the University of Southern California in 2009 by Grace Lee and Hillary Levi. With the help of leading fraternity experts and consultants, the fraternity now thrives with its overhauled and significantly improved national structure, growing expansion projects, passionate membership, and close-knit alumni.

Present
In the spring of 2009, a group of students at USC re-established the Alpha chapter. It has since grown to be the largest undergraduate student group at the School of Cinematic Arts, again encompassing all divisions of study and bringing guests such as Alan Myerson, John Landis, and John C. McGinley (on behalf of Spread the Word to End the Word) to campus as part of its DKA Speaker Series. In 2012, the national organization was revived and improved to allow for structure for organization and growth, continuity, national identity, expansion to other campuses, and much more.

At the beginning of 2013, a group of students re-established the Delta chapter at UCLA after disbanding in the 1970s. Initially as a colony in January of 2013, the Delta chapter became a fully fledged chapter in the spring of that year.

Delta Kappa Alpha chapters are organized into Resident Councils, which include the current student members of a chapter, and Graduate Councils, made up of all members who have graduated or left school. Each council of a chapter is entitled to a vote at the National Convention, which meets every two years and is the highest level of authority in the organization. The convention elects National Council members who serve as a board of directors for the fraternity and governs between conventions. In the off-year when National Conventions are not held, a convention called "Conclave" is held. Its purpose is to further create community between the chapters and share ideas.

The national organization is made up of multiple corporations, including the Delta Kappa Alpha Foundation.  The Delta Kappa Alpha Foundation was created in 2013 as a separate charitable organization. As a public, charitable, and educational foundation, the mission of the Delta Kappa Alpha Foundation is to ensure the development of philanthropic support necessary to sustain high levels of educational programming by fostering lifelong relationships and commitment to the fraternity's ideals.  The key functions of the separate organization are rooted in the idea that the foundation must provide vehicles for members to fulfill their lifelong commitment to Delta Kappa Alpha and to fellow brothers and sisters.

The Chief Executive Officer executes the National Council's plan and serves as a mediator between the Council and Foundation Board. The Fraternity Executive Offices staff assists with implementing said plan. The staff is divided into four departments: chapter services, education (career support), finance, and communications.

Delta Kappa Alpha's national partner is SeriousFun.

Symbols 
Delta Kappa Alpha's letters (DKA) stand for Dramatic Kinematic Aesthetic. The fraternity's colors are deep royal blue and old gold. Its symbol is the film camera and its mascot is the dragon. Its flower is the white carnation. Delta Kappa Alpha's public slogan in "Cinematic Artists of Character" and its open motto is "Truth in Illusion". The fraternity nickname is  DeKA, meaning "ten" in Greek and representing the 10 founders and the 10 jewels of a Delta Kappa Alpha member.

Collegiate chapters
Chapter list from the national website. Active chapters are indicated in bold. Inactive chapters are indicated in italic.

Notable alumni 

Julie Andrews
Fred Astaire
Lucille Ball
Lucien Ballard
Anne Baxter
Steve Bloom
Charles Brackett
Joe E. Brown
Frank Capra
William Castle
Stanley Cortez
Delmer Daves
John Cromwell
George Cukor
Cecil B. DeMille
Stanley Donen
Kirk Douglas
Irene Dunne
Allan Dwan
Blake Edwards
Rudi Fehr
Sylvia Fine
Glenn Ford
John Ford
Gene Fowler
William A. Fraker
John G. Frayne
Arthur Freed
Karl Freund
Lee Garmes
Greer Garson
William Goetz
Jerry Goldsmith
John Green
Conrad Hall
Henry Hathaway
Sir Cedric Hardwicke
Howard Hawks
Edith Head
Alfred Hitchcock
James Wong Howe
Ross Hunter
John Huston
Ub Iwerks
Norman Jewison
Chuck Jones
Producer Howard Kazanjian
Gene Kelly
Stanley Kramer
Fritz Lang
Jesse Lasky
Jack Lemmon
Mervyn LeRoy
Sol Lesser
Harold Lloyd
Director George Lucas
Rouben Mamoulian
Michelle Manning
Frances Marion
Walter Matthau
Steve McQueen
William Cameron Menzies
Arthur Miller
Paul Newman
Jack Oakie
Gregory Peck
William Perlberg
Mary Pickford
David Raksin
Hal Roach
Miklos Rosza
Rosalind Russell
Editor Arthur Schneider
George Seaton
William Seiter
Mark Serrurier
Robert Snyder
Steven Spielberg
Barbara Stanwyck
George Stevens
Jimmy Stewart
Gloria Swanson
Daniel Taradash
Norman Taurog
Gregg Toland
William Tuttle
King Vidor
Slavko Vorkapich
Jerry Wald
Hal Wallis
Jack L. Warner
Lawrence Weingarten
Orson Welles
Mae West
Wally Westmore
Haskell Wexler
Charles Wheeler
Albert Whitlock
Billy Wilder
Elmo Williams
Robert Wise
Joanne Woodward
William Wyler
Fred Zinnemann
Adolph Zukor

Delta Kappa Alpha dinners and honorees
Delta Kappa Alpha had an annual banquets in January/February which honored figures in the Cinema industry and presented them with honorary membership in the fraternity. Honorees include:

1953 Arthur Charles Miller
1957 William A. Seiter
1957 (November) Gene Kelly
1958 Cecil B. Demille
1959 George Cukor
1961 Greer Garson and Kirk Douglas
1963 (25th anniversary) Mary Pickford and Harold Lloyd
1964 Gloria Swanson, Adolph Zukor, Jack Lemmon, Charles Brackett, and Billy Wilder
1965 Rosalind Russell, Norman Taurog and Robert Wise
1966 Lucille Ball, Gregory Peck and Hal Wallis
1967 Irene Dunne and Jack Oakie
1968 Mae West, Mervyn LeRoy and James Stewart
1969 Conrad Hall and Kathryn Ross

1970 Julie Andrews and Norman Jewison
1972 Edith Head, Alfred Hitchcock, Walter Matthau and Sidney J. Solow, president of Consolidated Film Industries
1973 Paul Newman, Joanne Woodward, Daniel Taradash and Lester Novros
1974 Barbara Stanwyck, Johnny Green and William Castle
1975 Fred Astaire and Stanley Donen
1976 Glenn Ford
1977 Albert Whitlock
1978 Disney's Nine Old Men and Neil Simon
1979 Russ Meyer
2014 Herbert E. Farmer

Additional honorary members

1959 John G. Frayne

See also

 Professional fraternities and sororities

References

Student organizations established in 1936
Professional fraternities and sororities in the United States
Professional Fraternity Association
1936 establishments in California